Eldar Pine State Reserve is a state reserve in Azerbaijan. It was established on the area of 16.86 km2 of Samuh administrative region on December 16, 2004. 

In 1967 the reserve (with the area of 3.92 km2) was transformed into the branch of Goy-Gol State Reserve.

At present this reserve surrounds 16.86 km2 area and complex has been founded in the reserve.

Eldar Pine
The reserve is mainly designed for preserving and protecting of rare and endemic species of trees; Eldar Pine.

Expansion
On December 28, 2006, the Azerbaijani Minister of Ecology and Natural Resources Minister; Huseyn Bagirov announced the expansion of the Eldar Pine State Reserve. The minister said a project concerning the enlargement of the territory had been launched. The main goal of the project is to protect one of the rare trees of the nature, the Eldar Pine tree, which can only be found in the region.

See also
 Nature of Azerbaijan
 National Parks of Azerbaijan
 State Reserves of Azerbaijan
 State Game Reserves of Azerbaijan

References

State reserves of Azerbaijan